It's About Time is the twelfth studio album released by American singer-songwriter Kenny Loggins. Released in 2003, it was his first non-Christmas, non-children's album since 1997's The Unimaginable Life as well as his first following termination from Columbia Records while working on the album. Besides Loggins, several other noteworthy musicians co-wrote and performed on the album. These include frequent Loggins cohort Michael McDonald, as well as fellow soft-rocker Richard Marx and country singer Clint Black.

Track listing

Personnel 
 Kenny Loggins – lead vocals, backing vocals, acoustic guitar, electric guitar, horn arrangements 
 Michael McDonald – acoustic piano (1), clavinet (1)
 Tim Akers – clavinet, Hammond organ
 Dominic Camardella – keyboards, organ
 Carl Herrgesell – Wurlitzer electric piano
 Paul Garcia – programming, backing vocals 
 Tim Johnson – programming 
 Brian Mann – acoustic piano, synthesizers
 Richard Marx – keyboards, acoustic piano
 Tommy Sims – synthesizers, Minimoog, Hammond organ, programming, Moog bass, guitar, bass guitar, percussion, backing vocals 
 Jerry McPherson – guitar 
 Chris Rodriguez – guitar
 Clint Black – electric guitar (3)
 Doug Ingoldsby – acoustic guitar (6), backing vocals (6)
 Tom Hemby – acoustic guitar, dobro 
 Gordon Kennedy – acoustic guitar 
 Dan Dugmore – pedal steel guitar
 Phil Madeira – lap steel guitar
 Bruce Atkinson – bass guitar 
 Randy Tico – fretless bass 
 Herman Matthews – drums, vocal percussion
 Dan Needham – drums
 Rock Deadrick – percussion 
 Chris Ralles – percussion
 Javier Solís – percussion
 Daryl Tibbs – percussion
 Craig Young – percussion, programming 
 Terry McMillan – harmonica 
 Jim Horn – saxophone, horn arrangements
 Barry Green – trombone 
 Mike Haynes – trumpet 
 Don Harper – string arrangements and conductor 
 Carl Gorodetzky – concertmaster 
 The Nashville String Machine – strings
 Amy Holland – backing vocals (1)
 Josie Aiello – backing vocals 
 Jerard Woods – backing vocals 
 Jovaun Woods – backing vocals 
 Glen Phillips – backing vocals (7)

Production 
 Kenny Loggins – producer 
 Tommy Sims – producer, engineer
 Richard Marx – producer
 Jamie Kiner – production coordination
 Ricky Cobble – engineer
 David Cole – engineer
 Danny Duncan – engineer
 Bryan Lenox – engineer
 Fred Paragano – strings engineer 
 Tony Sheppard – engineer, mixing 
 Grady Walker – engineer
 Dominic Camardella – assistant engineer
 John Cranfield – assistant engineer
 Drew Douthit – ProTools Editing
 Tommy Graham – ProTools Editing
 Stephen Marsh – mastering 
 Ivy Skoff – album coordination
 Janet Wolsburn – art direction, design
 Carl Studna – photography

References

2003 albums
Albums produced by Richard Marx
Kenny Loggins albums